The Stroud and District Football League is a football competition based in England. The league was established in 1902 and is affiliated to the Gloucestershire County FA. It has a total of six divisions with the highest, Division One, sitting at level 14 of the English football league system. It is a feeder to the Gloucestershire Northern Senior League (GNSL).

Tredworth Tigers were League Champions for the 2021–22 season and were subsequently promoted to the GNSL.

The League will be sponsored (for a second season) in 2022-23 by Bateman's Sports (based in central Stroud) and Kappa.

History

The Stroud and District League was founded in 1902 and serves the central (or mid) part of Gloucestershire from Gloucester and Churchdown in the north, to Cirencester in the east, to Thornbury and Chipping Sodbury in the south.  The League's geographical area is within a 20 mile road radius of central Stroud, GL5 1AB.

The first ever winners of the league were Brimscombe.

Among the clubs that have left the S&DFL and now compete at a higher level are:
Brimscombe (now known as Brimscombe & Thrupp)
Frampton United F.C
Forest Green Rovers
Longlevens
Hardwicke
Shortwood United
Slimbridge
Stonehouse Town
Thornbury Town
Tuffley Rovers

Member clubs 2022–23
Division One - 14 teams
Chalford Reserves, Gala Wilton Reserves, Kingsway Rovers, Kingswood, Leonard Stanley, Minchinhampton, Minety, Old Richians, Quedgeley Wanderers Reserves, Randwick, Rodborough Old Boys, Tetbury Town, Wickwar Wanderers, Wotton Rovers

Division Two - 13 teams
AFC Renegades, Abbeymead Rovers, Cam Bulldogs Reserves, Hardwicke Reserves, Horsley United, Longford, Longlevens 3rds, Painswick, Sharpness Reserves, Taverners, Tuffley Rovers 3rds, Uley, Upton St Leonards Reserves

Division Three - 17 teams
Barnwood United Reserves, Berkeley Town Reserves, Cashes Green, Chalford 3rds, Charfield Reserves, Dursley Town Reserves, Gala Wilton 3rds, Hardwicke 3rds, Kings Stanley Reserves, Kingsway Rovers Reserves, Quedgeley Wanderers 3rds, Redmarley & Tibberton United, Rodborough Old Boys Reserves, South Cerney, Sherston Town, Stonehouse Town 3rds, Stroud United

Division Four - 17 teams
Boss, Cam Everside Wanderers, Cotswold Rangers, Frampton United 3rds, Gloster Rovers, Horsley United Reserves, Longlevens 4ths, Minchinhampton Reserves, Old Richians Res, Randwick Reserves, Robinswood Athletic, Sharpness 3rds, Stratton United, Tredworth Tigers Reserves, Trident, Tuffley Rovers 4ths, Wickwar Wanderers Reserves

Division Five - 17 teams
Abbeymead Rovers 3rds, Bush FC, Cam Bulldogs Reserves, Chalford 4ths, Dursley Town 3rds, Kingswood Reserves, Leonard Stanley Reserves, Longlevens 5ths, Painswick Reserves, Ramblers, Rising Stars, Rodborough Old Boys 3rds, Stroud United Reserves, Tetbury Town Reserves, Tuffley Rovers 5ths, Uley Reserves, Wotton Rovers Reserves

Division Six - 17 teams
AFC Renegades Reserves, Alkerton Rangers, Avonvale United, Brockworth Albion 3rds, Gala Wilton 4ths, Horsley United 3rds, Leonard Stanley 3rds, Longford Reserves, Mavericks, Minety Reserves, Nailsworth Town, Painswick 3rds, Randwick 3rds, Stonehouse Town 4ths, Stratton United Reserves, Taverners Reserves, Uley 3rds

Champions & Division Winners
1902–03: Brimscombe

League Cup Winners
(this replaced the Stroud & District Charity Cup Competition run for over 100 years)

In 2018-19, the Fred Gardiner and the Derek Freebury Shields were the former Section 'B' and 'D' Plate Competitions respectively.

Additional cups run:-

Harry Greening Trophy, won by Frampton United in 2018-19

Section ‘A’ (Plate Competition), won by Old Richians in 2018-19 and Gala Wilton Reserves in 2021-22

Section ‘C’ (Plate Competition), won by Gloster Rovers in 2019-20 and Minchinhampton Reserves in 2021-22

External links
Official website
League Tables – TheFA.com

References

 
1902 establishments in England
Football leagues in England
Sports leagues established in 1902
Football in Gloucestershire